The yellow-legged pigeon (Columba pallidiceps) is a bird species in the family Columbidae. It is found in the Bismarck and Solomon archipelagos. Its natural habitats are subtropical or tropical moist lowland forests and subtropical or tropical moist montane forests. It is threatened by habitat loss. It was formerly classified as Endangered by the IUCN. But new research has shown it to be not as rare as it was believed; consequently, it was downlisted to Vulnerable in 2008.

References

Cited works
 BirdLife International (BLI) (2008): [2008 IUCN Redlist status changes]. Retrieved 2008-MAY-23.

External links
BirdLife Species Factsheet.

yellow-legged pigeon
Birds of the Bismarck Archipelago
Birds of the Solomon Islands
yellow-legged pigeon
Taxonomy articles created by Polbot